Temple is a train station in Temple, Texas, United States served by Amtrak, the national railroad passenger system. The station was originally built as an Atchison, Topeka and Santa Fe Railway depot. East of the station on another railroad line through Temple, a former Missouri-Kansas-Texas Railroad depot can be found, as the nexus for trains bound for Waco, San Antonio and Houston.

History
The first depot in Temple was in a boxcar. Later a two-story depot was built. In 1898 a Harvey House was built next to the depot. The current station was opened on January 29, 1911.
Services included:
Texas Chief - (Chicago - Fort Worth - Galveston)
California Special (west to Clovis, NM, Belen, NM, Los Angeles, CA) / Texan (east to Houston, and via Missouri Pacific Railway to New Orleans)
services to Brownwood, and to Houston

In 1995, the city of Temple bought 8.5 acres of land around the station and the Santa Fe Railroad donated the building. In 1999, restoration work began on the depot and it was reopened on June 8, 2000.

The depot is currently home to the Temple Railroad and Heritage Museum and an Amtrak ticket office. The museum is open Monday through Saturday. The Amtrak office is open Monday through Saturday until the northbound Texas Eagle departs.

Next to the depot is the former Moody, Texas depot which is now home to the Central Texas Area Model Railroaders. Inside the depot is a model train layout which is open to the public on the first and fourth Saturday of each month.

North of Temple, the Texas Eagle is hosted by BNSF Railway; south of Temple, it uses the tracks of Union Pacific Railroad. Temple station also provides Amtrak Thruway Motorcoach service to Killeen and Fort Hood, Texas.

References

External links

Amtrak Texas Eagle Stations - Temple, TX
Temple Amtrak Station (USA Rail Guide -- Train Web)

Amtrak stations in Texas
Railway stations in the United States opened in 1911
Amtrak Thruway Motorcoach stations in Texas
Atchison, Topeka and Santa Fe Railway stations
Transportation in Bell County, Texas
Buildings and structures in Bell County, Texas